Federico Bessone (born 19 December 1972 in Córdoba, Argentina) is an Argentine former professional footballer who played as a defender for clubs of Argentina, Chile, England and France.

Teams
 Instituto de Córdoba 1990–1995
 Belgrano de Córdoba 1995–1997
 Godoy Cruz de Mendoza 1997–1999
 Coquimbo Unido 1999
 FC Gueugnon 2000–2001
 Bristol Rovers 2002
 Universitario de Córdoba 2003

References
 

Living people
1972 births
Argentine footballers
Association football defenders
Instituto footballers
Club Atlético Belgrano footballers
Coquimbo Unido footballers
Godoy Cruz Antonio Tomba footballers
FC Gueugnon players
Bristol Rovers F.C. players
Chilean Primera División players
Argentine Primera División players
Argentine expatriate footballers
Argentine expatriate sportspeople in Chile
Expatriate footballers in Chile
Argentine expatriate sportspeople in England
Expatriate footballers in England
Argentine expatriate sportspeople in France
Expatriate footballers in France
Footballers from Córdoba, Argentina